Agelasta lecideosa is a species of beetle in the family Cerambycidae. It was described by Francis Polkinghorne Pascoe in 1865. It is known from Borneo, Malaysia and Sumatra.

References

lecideosa
Beetles described in 1865
Taxa named by Francis Polkinghorne Pascoe